The Best Upset ESPY Award was conferred once each in 2004 and 2005 annually from 2007 until 2017 and again in 2019 to the team in a regular season or playoff game or series contested professionally under the auspices of one of the four major sports leagues in the United States and Canada or collegiately under the auspices of the National Collegiate Athletic Association adjudged to have completed the best, most significant, or most impressive upset in a given calendar year.

In 2004, award selections were made by fans voting over the Internet or at relevant sporting events from among choices determined by a panel of sportswriters and broadcasters, ESPN personalities, and retired sportspersons, whilst since 2005 voting has been undertaken by fans exclusively over the Internet from among choices determined by the ESPN Select Nominating Committee.  The ESPY Awards ceremony is conducted in July and awards conferred reflect performance and achievement over the twelve months previous to presentation.

There was no award presented in 2018, 2020 or 2021; however, an award was presented in 2019.

List of winners

See also
Sports underdog

References

ESPY Awards